Senator Peyton may refer to:

Balie Peyton (1803–1878), Tennessee State Senate
Joseph Hopkins Peyton (1808–1845), Tennessee State Senate
Robert Ludwell Yates Peyton (1822–1863), Confederate States Senator from Missouri from 1862 to 1863